Chané is an extinct language of Argentina and Bolivia. It was either a dialect of, or closely related to, the Terena language of the Arawakan language family. There is little data on this language. In Argentina, it was spoken in Salta province.

References

Languages of Argentina
Arawakan languages
Indigenous languages of the South American Southern Foothills
Extinct languages of South America
Languages extinct in the 18th century